Livingston station is a future Altamont Corridor Express station in Livingston, California. It is expected to open to revenue service in 2030 as part of the second phase of ACE's expansion to Merced. The station is located on Main Street. Turlock was selected over Atwater as a stop due to the distance between adjacent stations potentially resulting in fewer bottlenecks for freight trains.

References

Future Altamont Corridor Express stations
Railway stations scheduled to open in 2030
Railway stations in Merced County, California